The history of Korean animation, began with Japanese and American characters dominating the industry. The first sound animated character was created in 1936. The first Korean animation studio opened in Pyongyang in 1948. The first feature-length animated character appeared in 1967. Dooly the Little Dinosaur revolutionized the character market in 1987. As animation characters specific to Korea appeared, the Korean character market continued to grow. Since then, Korean character franchises have even exported their characters to other countries.

History 
 
According to records, the first sound animated character was 'Gaekkum' (개꿈), who was created in 1936. Before the division of the two Koreas, the Pyongyang animation study opened in 1948. In the same year, the north region of the parallel 38th became a communist republic.

South Korea 

Before the 1960s, Korean animation only existed for commercial advertising. Mun Dalbu created a successful animated commercial for Lucky Toothpaste, broadcast on HLKZ TV in 1956. After that, animation was widely used in Korean advertising. Shin Dong-hun and his apprentice Nelson Shin are the main animators in this period, using limited techniques due to the political situation and lack of animation schools.

Gaemi Wa Bechangi (The Ant and the Grasshopper) made by animators Jeong Do-bin, Han Seong-hak and Park Young-il, was the first independent animation film in the country. First animated feature,  (홍길동), was produced by Segi Company and animated by Shin Dong-heon in 1967. Shin did another animated film, Hoppie and Chadolbawee (1967), but as it didn’t get the same success, Shin quitted animation.

In 1987, Dooly the Little Dinosaur first aired as a six-part TV show, with another seven parts airing in 1988. In 1995, Kim Soo-jung, its creator, established a company named 'Dooly World' and went into the character design industry. The following year, the animated movie 'Dooly the Little Dinosaur' was released. In the 30 years since Dooly the Little Dinosaur launched, its related market generated 2–3 billion won per year (about 1.7–2.7 million dollars as of July 2018). This paved the way for the character market in Korea.

In 2003, Pororo the Little Penguin (뽀롱뽀롱 뽀로로) aired on EBS and became the new representation of Korean animation characters. Pororo aired in 127 countries around the world and was the first domestic animation to make a contract with Walt Disney Animation Studios directly. It was estimated that its brand value was worth  and its economic impact amounted to  5.7 trillion won in 2013. 

As of 2015, many other domestic Korean animations have gained popularity, such as Tobot (변신자동차 또봇), Larva (라바), and Tayo the Little Bus (꼬마버스 타요).

The animated Larva recorded  in sales in 2013. In addition, domestic characters such as Tayo the Little Bus have earned considerable sales due to the support of young children.

North Korea
From 1948 until the 1980s, the Pyongyang animation studio produced more than two hundred films. In the 1980s, the studio employed around six hundred workers, and twenty animation directors. Aside from local productions, the SEK Studio (North Korea's primary animation producer) has been providing animation services for foreign clients in Italy, Spain, France, China, Russia, Japan and indirectly for the United States.

Transition in character production methods 
In the 1980s–1990s, cartoon characters expanded mainly because comic books were popular.

Between 2000 and 2010, Flash characters became prevalent in Korea because, they facilitated production. Scaling does not affect quality and the files are much smaller, which increases speed of transmission.

Later in the decade, 3D animations were mainly done with 3D STUDIO MAX or MAYA software and their production costs are much greater than for 2D Flash animations.

References

External links
History of Tayo bus and Seoul bus (타요버스와 서울 시내버스의 역사) Article published in 2014 by the Seoul government.
Ride 'Larva', Where? (‘라바’를 ‘타요’, 어디서?) Article published in 2014 by the Seoul government.

Korean
Korean animation
South Korean animation
North Korean animation
Cinema of Korea